The Copa MS was a tournament organized by Federação de Futebol de Mato Grosso do Sul in order to decide how club would be the representative of the state at the 2011 Campeonato Brasileiro Série D.

In 2011, the competition was abolished.

List of champions

References

Football in Mato Grosso do Sul